Gloucester Rowing Club and Gloucester Hartpury is a rowing club on the Gloucester-Purton canal based at Gloucester Boathouse, David Hook Way, Hempsted, Gloucester.

History
The club was founded in 1846, making it one of the oldest rowing clubs in the United Kingdom. In 2017, the club moved to a new boathouse from 326 Bristol Road to the other side of the river near David Hook Way. The ground floor development which has been completed is due to be followed by further expansions.

Gloucester Hartpury
In 2010 Gloucester Rowing Club and Hartpury College set up a centre to enable Hartpury students to participate in one of the Great Britain's rowing team centres. In the relationship the students become members of the Gloucester Rowing Club where they access the rowing facilities. In return the senior rowers from the club are able to access the training facilities at the college. The relationship has brought significant success at national and international level.

Honours

British champions

Henley Royal Regatta

References

Sport in Gloucester
Gloucester
Sport in Gloucestershire
Rowing clubs in England